Matthew William Lawrence (born February 11, 1980) is an American actor and singer, known for his roles in Mrs. Doubtfire and Boy Meets World. Lawrence also starred in the series Brotherly Love with his real-life brothers Joey and Andrew.

Early life
Lawrence was born in Abington Township, Pennsylvania, the son of Donna Lynn (née Shaw), a personnel manager, and Joseph Lawrence Mignogna Sr., an insurance broker. His family's surname was changed to Lawrence from Mignogna before he was born. He is of half Italian, English, and Scottish descent. He is the middle-born of three boys; with two brothers, Joey Lawrence and Andy, both of whom are also actors. Lawrence attended classes at Abington Friends School.

Career
Lawrence began acting in the mid-1980s, his first role being that of Danny Carrington in Dynasty. He studied acting at HB Studio in New York City. He continued as a child actor through the early 1990s, appearing in many television and feature film roles, including the 1993 Robin Williams comedy Mrs. Doubtfire and the mid-1990s television series Superhuman Samurai Syber-Squad. In addition, he maintained starring roles in Brotherly Love, which starred his real life brothers, and in Boy Meets World in which he played Jack Hunter. Lawrence also appeared alongside Christopher Lloyd in Angels in the Endzone and starred in the Disney English dub version of Kiki's Delivery Service with Kirsten Dunst and Phil Hartman in 1998.

Lawrence's singing debut was in 1986, when he and Joey performed at the 1986 Macy's Thanksgiving Day Parade. (Matt sang at the 1991 Macy's Parade as well.)  Other musical Matt rarities can be found on two Gimme A Break episodes (in Nell's Secret Admirer, ″Johnny  B. Goode″ and in The Window; Part 1, ″Rock & Roll Music″); two Brotherly Love episodes (in A Roman Holiday, ″Silent Night″ and in Art Attack, ″Pigeon On Your Car″); Boy Meets World (″As Time Goes By″, ″This Dame″); and in the 2021 film Mistletoe Mixup (″O Holy Night″ with brothers Joey and Andrew.) Matt also played guitar on several of his earlier performances.

In 2011, Lawrence guest-starred on his brother's sitcom, ABC Family's Melissa & Joey.

In 2015, he reprised his role as Jack Hunter in the series Girl Meets World, a spin-off/sequel of Boy Meets World.

He competes on the twenty-fourth season of Worst Cooks in America, the show's seventh celebrity edition titled Thats So 90s, airing in April and May 2022.

Music career
In 2017, Matt started a band with Joey and Andy called Still Three. That February, they released their debut single "Lose Myself".

Personal life
Lawrence was previously engaged to Heidi Mueller from 2004 to 2006. He began dating professional dancer Cheryl Burke in February 2007 and remained in a relationship with her until their breakup in 2008. The pair reunited in 2017 and became engaged on May 3, 2018. On May 23, 2019, they wed in San Diego, California. On February 23, 2022, after a prolonged estrangement exacerbated by COVID-19, it was reported that Burke filed for divorce. On September 19, 2022, the divorce was finalized. In 
late 2022, Lawrence began dating Chilli of the R&B group TLC.

Filmography

Film

Television

References

External links
 
 Matt Lawrence on Instagram
 Still 3 on SoundCloud

American male child actors
American male film actors
American male television actors
American male voice actors
Living people
Male actors from Pennsylvania
People from Abington Township, Montgomery County, Pennsylvania
University of Southern California alumni
20th-century American male actors
21st-century American male actors
American people of English descent
American people of Italian descent
American people of Scottish descent
1980 births